The Discophoros, also spelled  Discophorus (Greek – "Discus-Bearer"), was a bronze sculpture by the classical Greek sculptor Polyclitus, creator of the Doryphoros and Diadumenos, and its many Roman marble copies.  (It is not, however, to be confused with Discobolus of Myron, which shows a discus being thrown, not carried.)

Like the Doryphoros and Diadumenos, it was created as an example of Polyclitus's "canon" of the ideal human form in sculpture.  It features a young, muscular, solidly-built athlete in a moment of thought  before throwing a discus. Most marble copies feature the addition of a marble tree stump – marble is weaker but heavier than bronze- as the stump is needed for support.  These copies are also often missing their arms, which are often restored.

A variant is at the Louvre Museum.

See also 
 Discobolus

References

Borbein, Adolf. "Polykleitos", in O. Palagia and J.J. Pollitt, eds, Personal Styles in Greek Sculpture (Yale Classical Studies XXX) (Cambridge University Press) 1998:66–90. Summarizing traditional attributions.
 Herbert Beck, Peter C. Bol, Maraike Bückling (Hrsg.): Polyklet. Der Bildhauer der griechischen Klassik. Ausstellung im Liebieghaus-Museum Alter Plastik Frankfurt am Main. Von Zabern, Mainz 1990 
 Detlev Kreikenbom: Bildwerke nach Polyklet. Kopienkritische Untersuchungen zu den männlichen statuarischen Typen nach polykletischen Vorbildern. "Diskophoros", Hermes, Doryphoros, Herakles, Diadumenos. Mann, Berlin 1990, 

Ancient Greek sculptures
Sculptures by Polyclitus
Archaeology of Greece
Roman copies of 5th-century BC Greek sculptures
Ancient Greek athletic art
Sculptures of men